Alena Hanáková (born 1 September 1958) is a Czech politician, who served as Minister of Culture of the Czech Republic between December 2011 and July 2013 as part of Petr Nečas' Cabinet. She was appointed on 20 December 2011, becoming the second woman in the government after Karolína Peake.

She served as mayor of Vizovice between 2006 and 2010.

References

1958 births
Culture ministers of the Czech Republic
Living people
Politicians from Zlín
Palacký University Olomouc alumni
Women mayors of places in the Czech Republic
Women government ministers of the Czech Republic
21st-century Czech women politicians
Members of the Chamber of Deputies of the Czech Republic (2010–2013)
Mayors and Independents Government ministers
TOP 09 Government ministers